The yellowhead jawfish (Opistognathus aurifrons) is a species of jawfish native to coral reefs in the Caribbean Sea. The head and upper body are a light, but brilliant, yellow color slowly fading to a pearlescent blue hue. It can reach a length of  TL. Yellowhead jawfishes are usually found in Florida. They are usually found in shallow areas where materials are available for burrow construction. The Jawfishes live in rubble areas and sand in groups of up to 70 species.

It remains near its relatively small territory, and is typically seen with only the head and upper section of its body protruding from its burrow, although it sometimes can be found hovering nearby. It is able to arrange material using its mouth, carrying sand, shells, or small rocks from one location to another.

It is a mouthbrooder, with the male carrying the eggs in its mouth until they hatch.

Yellowhead jawfish have two different types of responses to intruders. Flight or Fight. The type of response depends on the type of incoming fish. During flight, the fish will swim away from the intruder and in go into their burrow, covering the opening with a large rock. During fight, the fish will spit sand or rocks at the intruder.

In captivity
In the aquarium it feeds on planktonic matter, commonly taking brine shrimp, mysis shrimp, and prepared frozen and pelleted fish food. When other fish come near its territory, it will open its jaw wide and try to warn them off, but it rarely attacks. they are one of the most docile jawfish towards fish of its kind and can be kept in small groups of 1 per 10 gallons.

References

External links
 

Fish of the Atlantic Ocean
Yellowhead jawfish
Taxa named by David Starr Jordan
Taxa named by Joseph Cheesman Thompson
Fish described in 1905